The Bosnia and Herzegovina passport is a passport issued to citizens of Bosnia and Herzegovina for international travel.

The Bosnian passport is one of the 5 passports with the most improved rating globally since 2006 in terms of number of countries that its holders may visit without a visa. It is the 47th best passport in the world and allows citizens of Bosnia and Herzegovina to travel to 118 countries without visa or visa on arrival.

Biometric passports
One of the conditions for abolishment of visas of the Schengen states in 2011 for citizens of Bosnia and Herzegovina was the introduction of biometric passports (e-passport).
Agency for Identification Documents, Registers and Data Exchange of Bosnia and Herzegovina (IDDEEA) and Ministry of Interior in Bosnia and Herzegovina tested the system of biometric passports from July 4 to October 15, 2009. No passport is issued until automated checks with the Ministry of Interior, Registrar's Offices and other security agencies in Bosnia and Herzegovina is performed. 162 institutions are involved in the process of issuing biometric passports, and therefore this makes the Bosnian e-passport one of the safest passports in the world.
Originally it was announced that biometric passports would be tested until the end of 2009. On July 15, 2009, the Bosnian Minister of Civil Affairs announced that Bosnia and Herzegovina will begin issuing biometric passports on October 15, 2009, when a larger amount of passports will be delivered from German producer Bundesdruckerei.
From December 15, 2010 holders of Bosnian passport travel visa free through all Schengen states. In June 2014 IDDEEA announced that Bosnia and Herzegovina will introduce third generation of biometric passports (SAC) in October 2014, whereby Bosnia and Herzegovina shall be one of few countries to have a color image imprinted in poly-carbonate page.

Diplomatic passports
Holders of diplomatic passports of Bosnia and Herzegovina have visa waiver for certain countries for which obtaining pre-arrival visa for regular passport is required.

Visa requirements

As of October 2022, Bosnia and Herzegovina citizens had visa-free or visa on arrival access to 118 countries and territories, ranking the Bosnia and Herzegovina passport 51st in terms of travel freedom according to the Henley visa restrictions index. Bosnia and Herzegovina passport is one of the 5 passports with the most improved rating since 2006.

Gallery

See also
Bosnia and Herzegovina identity card
Visa requirements for Bosnia and Herzegovina citizens

References

Passports by country
Politics of Bosnia and Herzegovina